FloraNT is a public access web-based database of the Flora of the Northern Territory of Australia.  It provides authoritative scientific information on some 4300 native taxa, including descriptions, maps, images, conservation status, nomenclatural details together with names used by various aboriginal groups. Alien taxa (over 470 species) are also recorded. Users can access fact sheets on species and some details of the specimens held in the Northern Territory Herbarium, (herbaria codes, NT, DNA) together with keys, and some regional factsheets.

In the distribution guides FloraNT uses the  IBRA version 5.1  botanical regions.

The conservation act for NT flora (and fauna) is  the Territory Parks and Wildlife Conservation Act 1976 or TWPCA, and it uses the IUCN  criteria and categories.

Herbaria 
The Northern Territory Department of Environment and Natural Resources is responsible for the Northern Territory Herbarium which has two sites and two index herbariorum codes, DNA, at Palmerston, and NT in Alice Springs.

See also
For other online flora databases see List of electronic Floras.

References

External links

Official NTFlora website — homepage + search.
NT Flora: Threatened Species
Weeds of the Northern Territory

Online botany databases
Botany in the Northern Territory
Biological databases
Databases in Australia
Herbaria in Australia